The SPOTLIGHT project is a research project led by VU University Medical Center Amsterdam and part-funded by the European Union 7th Framework Programme concerning health. Initial EU funding is for the period 2013–2016, covering part of the budget of €3.7m. The project is listed on the European Commission CORDIS site.

Purpose  
SPOTLIGHT is an acronym for ‘Sustainable prevention of obesity through integrated strategies’ with the objective to systematically define the factors necessary for establishing effective health promotion approaches among adults, at different levels in varying contexts - individual, family, organisational, and environments that can change behaviour, lifestyles, and life skills to sustainably reduce obesogenic behaviours. The core objective is to provide an evidence-based model for effective integrated intervention approaches in health promotion practice applicable across European regions. Further details are shown on the project website.

Outputs  
Project outputs will include (i) reviews  and analyses of the strengths and weaknesses of ongoing community interventions to prevent obesity and promote health in European member states; (ii) an interactive, map-based database of at least 80 community interventions active during the period of the project; (iii) guidance to sponsors and funders of interventions on the elements that make for successful interventions; (iv) guidance and instruction manuals on using virtual analyses of environments (e.g. using Google Street View) for estimating the ‘obesogenicity’ of the environment.

Consortium 
 VU University Medical Center (The Netherlands) Coordinating centre
 Technical University of Lisbon (Portugal)
 The London School of Hygiene & Tropical Medicine (United Kingdom)
 The University of Bergen (Norway)
 The University of Oxford (United Kingdom)
 Ghent University (Belgium)
 English Metropolitan University College (Denmark)
 Maastricht University (The Netherlands)
 Nutrition Epidemiology Unit, Université Paris (France)
 Blox Group (The Netherlands)
 University of Debrecen (Hungary)
 The European Association for the Study of Obesity
 The World Obesity Federation

External links 
 Project website www.spotlightproject.eu 
 European Commission CORDIS project listings

References  

Research projects
Obesity researchers